Ishutin is a Russian masculine surname; its feminine counterpart is Ishutina. Notable people with the surname include:
Danil Ishutin (born 1989), Ukrainian computer game player
Nikolai Ishutin (1840–1879), one of the first Russian utopian socialists

Russian-language surnames